Abu al-Hasan 'Abd al-'Aziz b. al-Harith b. Asad b. al-Layth al-Tamimi (929–981/2 CE; 317–371 AH) was a Muslim saint who belonged to the Junaidia order.

Biography
Abdul Aziz bin Hars bin Asad Yemeni Tamimi was the disciple of Abu Bakr Shibli and became his successor (khalifah) on 21 Muharram 340 AH. He was an ardent worshipper and ascetic. He was an individual of high spirituality and perception and was known for his remarkable wit and learning. Yemeni was a part of his name as he was born and lived in Yemen. He belonged to the tribe Banu Tamim of Arabia thus part of his name was Tamimi.

Spiritual Lineage
Muhammad
'Alī bin Abī Ṭālib
al-Ḥasan al-Baṣrī
Habib al Ajami
Dawud Tai
Maruf Karkhi
Sirri Saqti
Junaid Baghdadi, the founder of Junaidia silsila
Abu Bakr Shibli
Abdul Aziz bin Hars bin Asad Yemeni al-Tamimi
He conferred khilafat to his son and disciple Abu al-Fadl al-Tamimi who continued the order.

See also
 al-Tamimi
 Abu al-Fadl al-Tamimi

References

Further reading
 Tazkera ol Ouliya
The Sufis Idries Shah

Hanbalis
Kullabis
Yemeni Sufi saints
10th-century Yemeni people
929 births
981 deaths
9th-century Arabs
10th-century Arabs